Spellbinder is a novel by Stephen Bowkett published in 1985.

Plot summary
Spellbinder is a novel in which the teenage hero uses actual magic to perform conjuring tricks.

Reception
Dave Langford reviewed Spellbinder for White Dwarf #67, and stated that "magic and fantasy do not conveniently depart from the hero's life the moment he's been taught some cheap moral lesson: here the poor sod has to learn to live with a responsibility which is his for the next sixty years. Right on."

Reviews
Review by Nik Morton (1985) in Vector 126
Review by Anne Gay (1985) in Fantasy Review, August 1985

References

1985 novels